The 39 members of the Parliament of Vanuatu from 1979 to 1983 were elected on 14 November 1979.

List of members

References

 1979